FC Karelia Petrozavodsk is an association football team from Petrozavodsk (in 2011 temporarily played in Saint Petersburg at Petrovsky Small Arena), Russia founded in 2011. It played in the Russian Second Division from 2011 to 2012–13 season, after which it dropped the professional status. It returned to the third-level Russian Professional Football League for the 2015–16 season, after which it dropped out of professional-level competitions once again.

External links
 Official website

Association football clubs established in 2011
Football clubs in Russia
Sport in Petrozavodsk
2011 establishments in Russia